The eleventh-generation Honda Civic (FE/FL) is a compact car (C-segment) manufactured by Honda since 2021, replacing the tenth-generation Civic. It was launched in the North American market in June 2021, Southeast Asia in August, Japan and China in September, and Australia and New Zealand in December. It was released in Europe in late 2022. The fastback / liftback  variation (marketed as "Civic Hatchback") was unveiled on June 23, 2021, for North America and Japan. This generation is also the first Civic since the second-generation not to offer a coupe version due to its declining sales.

Development 
Development of the eleventh-generation Civic was led by large project leader Tomoyuki Yamagami. The design approach of the model is referred by Honda as "Man-Maximum, Machine-Minimum".

The model also adopts low beltline, and door-mounted side mirrors previously adopted by the eighth and ninth-generation Civic to improve visibility.

The body structure received an 8 percent improvement of torsional rigidity and 13 percent improvement of bending rigidity compared to the previous generation, which supports improvements in ride, handling and NVH. The suspension setup had been tuned to take maximum advantage of the stiffer body structure and additional  of wheelbase for an improved ride quality.

For this generation, the Civic Hatchback features a fastback coupe-inspired profile similar to liftbacks. Alongside Japan, the Civic Hatchback is produced in the U.S. at the Greensburg, Indiana plant.

Civic e:HEV
The hybrid version, marketed as Civic e:HEV, was revealed on March 23, 2022, in both sedan and fastback / liftback configurations. The Civic e:HEV fastback / liftback became available in Japan and Europe, while the Civic e:HEV sedan became available in Thailand. The model is powered by a newly developed 2.0-litre Atkinson cycle petrol engine with direct injection, combined with a lithium-ion battery and two electric motors.

The Civic e:HEV replaced the Insight as part of a plan to focus on hybrid models of its 3 core models, which are CR-V, Accord and Civic.

Civic Type R 

The performance-oriented derivative of the eleventh-generation Civic Hatchback was introduced as the sixth-generation Civic Type R was introduced on July 20, 2022. Equipped with widened fenders like its predecessor, the FL5 in contrast gained widened rear doors and rear quarters instead of using a plastic add-on to achieve wider rear fenders.

Markets

North America 
The eleventh-generation Civic was released on June 16, 2021, as a 2022 model in North America. In the United States, the Civic comes in 4 trim levels; LX, Sport, EX and Touring (Sport Touring on the Civic Hatchback). LX and Sport models come with a 2.0-liter four-cylinder engine, while the EX and Touring models come with a 1.5-liter turbocharged four-cylinder. In Canada, the Civic comes with the same 4 trim levels but instead arranged as LX, EX, Sport, and Touring in the lineup. Only the Touring model received the more powerful 1.5-liter turbocharged four-cylinder engine. All sedan and liftback models come standard with a CVT, however, the liftback can be equipped with a 6-speed manual transmission on Sport and Sport Touring models.

The Si version was unveiled in October 2021 for the 2022 model year. Available only as a sedan, it has a four-cylinder 1.5-liter  turbocharged gasoline engine paired with a 6-speed manual transmission.

On August 6, 2021, the eleventh-generation Civic sedan was launched in the Mexican market. Powered by either a 2.0-liter engine or a turbocharged 1.5-liter engine, it is offered in the i-Style, Sport, and Touring trim lines.

The 2023 model year eliminated the LX trim, leaving the Sport trim to be the base trim. The LX trim was later reintroduced in the 2023 model year as demand was high enough.

Southeast Asia 
The eleventh-generation Civic in the Southeast Asian market is only offered in sedan body style due to low demand of the hatchback version of the previous generation.

In Thailand, the eleventh-generation Civic was launched on August 6, 2021, in EL, EL+ and RS trim levels. Hybrid models was released in March 2022.

In Indonesia, the eleventh-generation Civic was launched on October 28, 2021, in RS trim, powered with a 1.5-liter turbo engine paired with CVT and standard Honda Sensing.

In the Philippines, the eleventh-generation Civic was released on November 23, 2021, initially offered in S, V and RS grades. All models are powered with a 1.5-liter turbo engine paired with CVT and Honda Sensing. In January 2023, the base S grade was removed in the lineup due to low sales.

In Malaysia, the eleventh-generation Civic was revealed in late December 2021 and launched on 13 January 2022. 3 trim levels are available: E, V and RS. All trims are powered by a revised L15B7 1.5-liter turbo engine. The e:HEV RS hybrid trim was revealed in October 2022 as a pre-production model and was launched on 15 November 2022. Honda Sensing are standard on all variants.

In Vietnam, the eleventh-generation Civic was launched on February 16, 2022, in 3 trim levels: E, G and the RS. All models are powered with the 1.5-liter turbo engine.

Japan 
The eleventh-generation Civic fastback / liftback was revealed in Japan on August 5, 2021, and went on sale on September 3. It was manufactured locally in Yorii, Saitama. The Japanese market Civic fastback / liftback is available in LX and EX trim levels, powered with a 1.5-liter L15C turbocharged engine paired with either 6-speed manual transmission or CVT.

China 
The eleventh-generation Civic sedan was released in China in September 2021. In the same month, a restyled version produced by Guangqi Honda was released as the Honda Integra. The hatchback version of the Integra was introduced in February 2023.

Australia and New Zealand 
The eleventh-generation Civic hatchback was released in Australia on 6 December 2021. Only the fastback / liftback version is offered, due to lower sales of the sedan variant in the previous generation.

Pakistan 
The eleventh-generation Civic was launched in Pakistan in March 2022 as a locally assembled model. Only available as a sedan, three trim levels are offered: 1.5 Turbo Standard, 1.5 Turbo Oriel and 1.5 Turbo RS. The Standard and Oriel trims received a low-power engine tune, producing  while the top RS trim produces . The RS version also receives additional exterior trims such as spoiler and black accents.

Europe 
The eleventh-generation Civic in Europe is imported from Japan following the closure of the brand's UK Swindon plant. Only the fastback / liftback with a hybrid powertrain will be offered.

Powertrain

References 

ANCAP small family cars
ASEAN NCAP small family cars
Euro NCAP small family cars
Cars introduced in 2021
11
Motor vehicles manufactured in the United States
Vehicles with CVT transmission
Hybrid electric cars